A balikbayan box is a corrugated box containing items sent by overseas Filipinos (known as "balikbayans", literally "returning to the country/nation"). Though often shipped by freight forwarders specializing in balikbayan boxes by sea, such boxes can be brought by Filipinos returning to the Philippines by air.

History
In 1973 the Philippine Government under the former Philippine President Ferdinand Marcos began to specifically encourage Filipino Americans to visit their family home towns in the Philippines. Individuals who did so became known as balikbayan, from the tagalog words balik, "to return", and bayan, "town/settlement". As part of this program, customs procedures were eased for these travellers. This program was maintained and expanded by subsequent administrations. Individuals who returned often brought gifts for friends and family, part of a culture of using gifts to show appreciation and improve relations by those who were seen by the community as having achieved success in a career abroad. For those returning with valid balikbayan status, customs fees were waived for the contents of two boxes per individual. Eventually, it became common to package gifts, often household goods and other practical items, in a box while still abroad. The boxes would then be shipped to the Philippines.

The balikbayan box became popular circa the 1980s in the United States due to the influx of overseas Filipino workers in the country. The first freight forwarder to offer balikbayan box services was Rico Nunga, who started REN International in Los Angeles, California, in 1981. The following year, Ramon Ungco, a Filipino residing in New York City, founded Port Jersey Shipping International. These two companies are considered the pioneers of door-to-door delivery of balikbayan boxes, which back then were charged import duties upon arrival in the Philippines.

On June 30, 1987, then-Philippine President Corazon Aquino enacted Executive Order No. 206. This order amended Section 105 (f), and added a new subsection (f-1) to Republic Act No. 1937, also known as the Tariff and Customs Code of the Philippines, which was signed into law on July 22, 1957, by former president Carlos P. Garcia.

The amended Section 105 of the Tariff and Customs Code of the Philippines provides duty- and tax-free privileges to balikbayan boxes sent to the Philippines by overseas Filipino workers (OFWs) as recognition of their labors in foreign lands, as well as bringing additional foreign exchange annually, that contributed to the national recovery effort. This allowed tax-free entry of personal goods into the country from Filipinos overseas. People then began sending balikbayan boxes through friends and co-workers returning to the Philippines.

After the September 11 attacks in the US, and the passage of the Patriot Act by the US Congress, balikbayan boxes have been subjected to rigorous inspections by the United States Department of Homeland Security's Out-Bound Exam Team that caused delays of up to three weeks at the US Customs inspection facility. This extended shipping time from 21 days to over 30 days. The inspections also resulted in opened balikbayan boxes and complaints of package pilferage and mishandling. The Philippine Bureau of Customs also conducts 100% inspections that added to the burden of delayed shipments. The inspections are the result of some unscrupulous individuals using balikbayan boxes to smuggle commercial items without paying taxes, or to smuggle contraband. Since balikbayan box shipping is a consolidated shipment, one illegal item will affect all approximately 400 packages in the container. The inspection process has been modernized with the installation of high performance X-ray machines.

In 2012, these delays were further aggravated by the decision of the City of Manila to impose a truck ban on the route to the Port of Manila, causing backlogs in releasing and transporting all cargo, domestic and international. Most balikbayan box companies, which are based in Parañaque near the airport, were significantly affected by the truck ban until it was resolved.

The industry was scrutinized by the Philippine Senate in 2015, after complaints were brought to the attention of the public via social media after the Philippine Customs Commissioner, Albert Lina, announced the opening of balikbayan boxes for inspection and additional taxes to be imposed. The inquiry brought the passage of the Customs Modernization Act, which had been pending for years, and the inclusion of the Balikbayan Box Law in the act, increasing the tax-exemption ceiling from PHP 500 to PHP 150,000. This included items being brought home by Filipino tourists from trips abroad, pasalubong or gifts, and returning resident shipments.

To protect consumers, the Department of Trade and Industry (DTI), through its Philippine Shipper's Bureau, conducts regular accreditation of international freight forwarders and discourages consumers from patronizing unaccredited and incredibly cheap shipping companies.

According to the Door to Door Consolidated Association of the Philippines 400,000 balikbayan boxes arrive in the Philippines monthly.

Description
Balikbayan boxes may contain items the sender thinks the recipient would like, regardless of whether those items can be bought cheaply in the Philippines, such as non-perishable food, toiletries, household items, electronics, toys, designer clothing, or items difficult to find in the Philippines. A balikbayan box intended for air travel is designed to conform to airline luggage restrictions and many Filipino stores sell them. Some boxes come with a cloth cover and side handles. Others are tightly secured with tape or rope, and thus not confused with an ordinary moving box that is lightly wrapped.

The balikbayan boxes come in three standard sizes: 
 Medium: 
 Large: 
 Extra large: 

Shipped boxes are delivered directly to the recipient, usually the family of the overseas Filipino.

Cultural significance
Part of the attraction of the balikbayan box is its economic value, as it allows cheaper shipment of items versus shipping in smaller boxes via postal services. The tradeoff is longer transit time by container ship, typically requiring several weeks, and the lack of a definite delivery date. The balikbayan box is a modern manifestation of the Philippine custom of pasalubong, where domestic or foreign travelers are expected to bring gifts for family, friends and colleagues. Balikbayan boxes provide connection between family in the Philippines and those abroad, and provide goods for the family in the Philippines.

See also
Padala

References

Further reading

Philippine culture
Postal systems